Nina Christen (born 7 February 1994) is a Swiss sports shooter. She competed in the women's 10 metre air rifle event at the 2016 and 2020 Summer Games, winning bronze in 2020. Winning the 50 m rifle three positions event with an Olympic record, Christen became the first Swiss to claim a gold medal in women's Olympic shooting.

References

External links
 

1994 births
Living people
Swiss female sport shooters
Olympic shooters of Switzerland
Shooters at the 2016 Summer Olympics
Sportspeople from Nidwalden
Shooters at the 2019 European Games
European Games gold medalists for Switzerland
European Games silver medalists for Switzerland
European Games medalists in shooting
Medalists at the 2020 Summer Olympics
Olympic gold medalists for Switzerland
Olympic bronze medalists for Switzerland
Shooters at the 2020 Summer Olympics
Olympic medalists in shooting